Zakaria Mohieddin (5 July 1918 – 15 May 2012) was an Egyptian military officer, politician, Prime Minister of Egypt and head of the first Intelligence body in Egypt, the Egyptian General Intelligence Directorate.

Overview
Mohieddin attended the Military College in 1938 and was a Staff College graduate in 1948. He was the professional army professor of tactics in the Officers Military College from 1940 to 1943 and again from 1950 to 1951. He was also the professor of tactics in the Officers Staff College from 1951 to 1952.

In 1967 following the defeat of Egypt in the Six-Day Wat Mohieddin was appointed by president Gamal Abdel Nasser to take over position of president after Nasser's resignation, an appointment he refused. In 1968, he resigned from all positions and quit public life. The same year he was arrested due to his alleged involvement in the coup plans against Nasser.

As of 2005, after the death of Hussein El-Shafei and until his own death in 2012, he and his first cousin Khaled Mohieddin were the last two surviving members of the Revolutionary Command Council.

On 15 May 2012, Mohieddin died at the age of 93.

Military
Mohieddin had various assignments within the army. He served with the Egyptian army in Sudan. In 1948, he was the chief of staff of the first brigade which was later besieged at Faluja. One of his outstanding achievements in 1948 was to go back to the besieged brigade, infiltrating enemy lines from Rafah to Faluja. He was rewarded for his bravery at the end of the war with the Mehmet Ali golden award for valour and excellence in duty in the field in Palestine. In 1952, he prepared strategy for army movement and was in charge of operation that led to success of the movement.

Political

Positions held
1952-1956 - Member of Egyptian Revolutionary Command Council.
1952-1955 - In charge of the first Intelligence body the Egyptian General Intelligence Directorate
1953-1958 - Minister of Interior.
1958-1961 - Central Minister of Interior for Egypt and Syria during U.A.R.
1961-1962 - Minister of Interior.
1961-1968 - Vice President of Egypt.
1965-1966 - Prime Minister and Minister of Interior.

Committees and boards
Head of the High Commission for the High Dam
Head of Egyptian Rowing Federation (1960–68)
Head of Egyptian Greek Friendship Committee (1958–68)
Member of the Board of the Officers Club  (1951–52)
Member of the High Committee of Socialist Arab Unity (the leading party or the only political party)
Member of National Defense Committee.

Conferences attended
Egypt delegation to UN - 1960
African conference Addis Ababa - 1964
Arab conference Casablanca - 1965
Bandong - 1965
Signed Nile treaty with Sudan

Death
Mohieddin died on the morning of 15 May 2012 at the age of 93. His funeral was held at the Aal Rashdan Mosque in Nasr City, which is associated with the Egyptian military. In addition to his family, several military and political figures attended the procession, including Sami Hafez Anan, Hussein Tantawi, Hamdeen Sabahi, Ahmed Shafiq, Amr Moussa and Kamal el-Ganzouri.

Honour

Foreign honour
Poland:
 Grand Cross of the Order of Polonia Restituta (1965)
Malaysia:
 Honorary Grand Commander of the Order of the Defender of the Realm (SMN (K)) - Tun (1965)

References

External links
The Six-Day War: A Retrospective. - book review

1918 births
2012 deaths
20th-century prime ministers of Egypt
Vice-presidents of Egypt
Prime Ministers of Egypt
Interior Ministers of Egypt
Arab Socialist Union (Egypt) politicians
Free Officers Movement (Egypt)
Egyptian military officers
People from Dakahlia Governorate
Honorary Grand Commanders of the Order of the Defender of the Realm
Directors of the General Intelligence Directorate (Egypt)
Directors of the Military Intelligence and Reconnaissance (Egypt)
Egyptian people of the 1948 Arab–Israeli War
Grand Crosses of the Order of Polonia Restituta
Egyptian prisoners and detainees